Halsnæs Kommune is a municipality (Danish, kommune) in Region Hovedstaden ("Capital Region"). The municipality covers a total area (land and water) of 122.15 km² (2013), according to Municipal Key Figures (De Kommunale Nøgletal (www.noegletal.dk)), and has a total population of 31,344 (1. January 2022). The municipality also includes the island Hesselø. Up to 20 km2 of the total area is water, as part of the largest lake in Denmark, Arresø, lies within the municipality.
Its name comes from Halsnæs, the peninsula that forms the western part of the municipality.

The municipality was created on 1 January 2007 as a merger of the former municipalities of Frederiksværk and Hundested.  
At first the merged municipality wore the hyphenated name Frederiksværk-Hundested, but it was changed to Halsnæs on 1 January 2008. Its mayor, as of 1 January 2018, is Steffen Jensen, a member of the Social Democrats political party.

Geography
Lake Arresø, the largest lake in Denmark, has its western part in the municipality. Originally a fjord connected to Kattegat, it was landlocked when the land northwest of the lake rose by 5 meters in the last ice age. In 1717, by royal order a canal was built (finished in 1719) to connect the lake with Roskilde fjord. The construction of the canal was necessary because the natural stream (Danish:å) from the lake to the fjord was filling up with sand. The water in the newly built canal was harnessed by a watermill, and the town of Frederiksværk basically was created through industrialization.

Urban areas
The ten largest urban areas in the municipality are:

Politics

Municipal council
Halsnæs' municipal council consists of 21 members, elected every four years.

Below are the municipal councils elected since the Municipal Reform of 2007.

Landmarks
Arresødal Castle, completed in 1788, now serves as a private hospital.

References 

 Municipal statistics: NetBorger Kommunefakta, delivered from KMD aka Kommunedata (Municipal Data)

External links 

  

 
Municipalities in the Capital Region of Denmark
Municipalities of Denmark
Populated places established in 2007
2007 establishments in Denmark